Por Ti is the 20th album and 17th studio album by Puerto Rican singer Ednita Nazario, released on November 18, 2003 by Sony Music. The album was certified Disco de Oro (Gold) by the RIAA on January 14, 2004 for selling over 100,000 in the states. It was later certified Disco Platinum (Platinum) for selling over 200,000.

Track listing
 "Por Ti" (You Made Me Find Myself) – 3:45
 "A Que No Te Vas" – 3:56
 "Si No Me Amas" – 4:09
 "Cansada de Estar Cansada" – 3:17
 "Más Mala Que Tú" – 4:34
 "Ahora" – 4:07
 "Cúrame" – 3:56
 "Química Ideal" – 4:12
 "Te Quedarás Hundido" – 4:23
 "El Privilegio de Dar" – 4:11

Singles
 "Si No Me Amas"
 "A Que No Te Vas"
 "Mas Mala Que Tu"

Personnel
 Produced by Ednita Nazario and Tommy Torres

Awards

Billboard Latin Music Awards

Chart performance

Sales and certifications

References

Ednita Nazario albums
2003 albums